This is a list of mayors of Charlottetown, Prince Edward Island:

References

Charlottetown